Afrim Kuci (born 19 May 1970 in Kosovska Mitrovica, SAP Kosovo) is a Kosovo Albanian retired footballer who played primarily as defender.

He has played for a number of sides in Yugoslavia, Sweden, Poland and Germany. On July 9, 2004, Kuci was admitted to hospital after suffering a stroke on a football pitch during pre-season game. He had to step aside from professional football due to hemiparesis and neurological disorders.

Now he is coach for Kv Mühlheim U14 ich hab nicht geglaubt am Anfang

References

External links
 
 
 
 Afrim Kuci at Sport.de 

1970 births
Living people
Sportspeople from Mitrovica, Kosovo
Kosovo Albanians
Association football defenders
Association football midfielders
Kosovan footballers
Albanian footballers
KF Trepça'89 players
KF Kosova Prishtinë players
Siarka Tarnobrzeg players
Sportfreunde Siegen players
Eintracht Braunschweig players
SV Elversberg players
Ekstraklasa players
Regionalliga players
Kosovan expatriate footballers
Expatriate footballers in Poland
Expatriate footballers in Sweden
Expatriate footballers in Germany
Kosovan expatriate sportspeople in Poland
Kosovan expatriate sportspeople in Sweden
Kosovan expatriate sportspeople in Germany